Walter Joseph O'Brien (2 January 1907 – 11 October 1983) was an Australian rules footballer who played with Footscray and Fitzroy in the Victorian Football League (VFL). His brother, Bernie, also played for Footscray in the VFL.

Notes

External links 

Wally O'Brien's playing statistics from The VFA Project

1907 births
1983 deaths
Australian rules footballers from Melbourne
Williamstown Football Club players
Western Bulldogs players
Fitzroy Football Club players
People from Footscray, Victoria